The Women's 50 metre backstroke event at the 2010 Commonwealth Games took place on 4 and 5 October 2010, at the SPM Swimming Pool Complex.

Four heats were held, with most containing the maximum number of swimmers (eight). The top sixteen advanced to the semifinals and the top eight from there qualified for the finals.

Heats

Semifinals

Semifinal 1

Semifinal 2

Final

References

Aquatics at the 2010 Commonwealth Games
2010 in women's swimming